Sesel Zvidzai was the Zimbabwe Deputy Minister of Local Government and Urban Development. He is the Member of House of Assembly for Chiwundura (MDC-T). He is MP for Gweru Urban. MDC-T is not currently in government. He is married with four children.

References

Members of the National Assembly of Zimbabwe
Living people
1960 births
Place of birth missing (living people)